Miroslav Savić (born 20 April 1973) is a Serbian former professional footballer who played as a defender.

Club career
After playing for Radnički Beograd, Savić moved to Obilić in 1996. He was a regular member of the team that won the 1997–98 First League of FR Yugoslavia. In January 2000, Savić was transferred to Greek side Aris Thessaloniki. He then spent one season at Bulgarian club Levski Sofia and won the league title.

International career
In 1998, Savić made two appearances for FR Yugoslavia in friendly matches against Argentina and Israel.

Honours
Obilić
 First League of FR Yugoslavia: 1997–98
 FR Yugoslavia Cup: Runner-up 1997–98
Levski Sofia
 Bulgarian First League: 2000–01

References

External links
 
 
 
 

Aris Thessaloniki F.C. players
Association football defenders
Azerbaijan Premier League players
First Professional Football League (Bulgaria) players
Expatriate footballers in Azerbaijan
Expatriate footballers in Bulgaria
Expatriate footballers in Greece
First League of Serbia and Montenegro players
FK Borac Banja Luka players
FK Hajduk Beograd players
FK Obilić players
FK Radnički Beograd players
FK Zemun players
Khazar Lankaran FK players
People from Prijedor
PFC Levski Sofia players
Serbia and Montenegro expatriate footballers
Serbia and Montenegro expatriate sportspeople in Azerbaijan
Serbia and Montenegro expatriates in Bulgaria
Serbia and Montenegro expatriates in Greece
Serbia and Montenegro footballers
Serbia and Montenegro international footballers
Serbian footballers
Serbs of Bosnia and Herzegovina
Super League Greece players
1973 births
Living people